924 Toni (prov. designation:  or ) is a large background asteroid, approximately  in diameter, from the outer regions of the asteroid belt. It was discovered on 20 October 1919, by German astronomer Karl Reinmuth at the Heidelberg-Königstuhl State Observatory. The X-type asteroid has a rotation period of 19.4 hours. It was named "Toni", a common German female name unrelated to the discoverer's contemporaries, that was taken from the almanac Lahrer Hinkender Bote.

Orbit and classification 

Toni is a non-family asteroid of the main belt's background population when applying the hierarchical clustering method to its proper orbital elements. It orbits the Sun in the outer asteroid belt at a distance of 2.5–3.4 AU once every 5.04 years (1,840 days; semi-major axis of 2.94 AU). Its orbit has an eccentricity of 0.15 and an inclination of 9° with respect to the ecliptic.

Naming 

This minor planet was named "Toni", after a female name picked from the Lahrer Hinkender Bote, published in Lahr, southern Germany. A Hinkender Bote (lit. "limping messenger") was a very popular almanac, especially in the alemannic-speaking region from the late 17th throughout the early 20th century. The calendar section contains feast days, the dates of important fairs and astronomical ephemerides. The German name day analogue is given next to the protestant and catholic entries in the calendar of saints (entry not found).

Reinmuth's calendar names 

As with 22 other asteroids – starting with 913 Otila, and ending with 1144 Oda – Reinmuth selected names from this calendar due to his many asteroid discoveries that he had trouble thinking of proper names. These names are not related to the discoverer's contemporaries. Lutz Schmadel, the author of the Dictionary of Minor Planet Names learned about Reinmuth's source of inspiration from private communications with Dutch astronomer Ingrid van Houten-Groeneveld, who worked as a young astronomer at Heidelberg.

Physical characteristics 

In the Bus–Binzel SMASS classification, Toni is an X-type asteroid, while in the Tholen classification, it is closest to a common, carbonaceous C-type asteroid and somewhat similar to an X-type (CX).

Rotation period 

In July 2014, a rotational lightcurve of Toni was obtained from photometric observations by Frederick Pilcher at the Organ Mesa Observatory  in New Mexico. Lightcurve analysis gave a well-defined rotation period of  hours with a brightness amplitude of  magnitude. This result supersedes previous observations with tentative period determinations by French amateur astronomers René Roy and Laurent Bernasconi.

Diameter and albedo 

The Collaborative Asteroid Lightcurve Link adopts the results obtained by IRAS, that is, an albedo of 0.0432 and a diameter of 85.49 km based on an absolute magnitude of 9.37.

Notes

References

External links 
 Lightcurve Database Query (LCDB), at www.minorplanet.info
 Dictionary of Minor Planet Names, Google books
 Asteroids and comets rotation curves, CdR – Geneva Observatory, Raoul Behrend
 Discovery Circumstances: Numbered Minor Planets (1)-(5000) – Minor Planet Center
 
 

000924
Discoveries by Karl Wilhelm Reinmuth
Named minor planets
000924
000924
19191020